Tonge Hall is a Grade II* listed Elizabethan manor house in Tonge, Middleton, Greater Manchester, England.

History
The manor of Tonge belonged in medieval times to the Tonge family but passed into other hands. The hall was built around 1584 and in 1890 was purchased by Asheton Tonge, a descendant of the original owners. After that the hall was acquired by Albert Wolstencroft, Mayor of Middleton and inherited by his son Captain Norman Wolstencroft. He left the area, leaving the building unoccupied and unprotected. In 2007 it was set on fire by arsonists and severely damaged.

Rochdale Council are now (2012) in the process of buying the property from the owner for a nominal sum with a view to restoration. The North West Building Preservation Trust, a registered charity, is likely to take over its long term maintenance.

Architecture
The hall is the remaining part of a black and white timber and plaster house standing on a low stone base but in an advanced state of decay and dilapidation following years of neglect and an arson attack. It stands on high ground above the valley of the Irk overlooking the town of Middleton.

It consists of the central and eastern wings of a once larger building, two storeys in height, with original timber and plaster construction on the north and east sides. The south and west sides were rebuilt in brick. The exterior timber-work consists of roughly-shaped black-painted beams and posts with square quatrefoil panels. The roofs are covered with grey stone slates with chimney stacks of brick set diagonally on a square base.

See also

Grade II* listed buildings in Greater Manchester
Listed buildings in Middleton, Greater Manchester

References

Country houses in Greater Manchester
Grade II* listed buildings in Greater Manchester
Middleton, Greater Manchester
Grade II* listed houses
Elizabethan architecture